Ardning is a municipality in the district of Liezen in the Austrian state of Styria.

References

External links

Cities and towns in Liezen District